The Caribbean chestnut moray, Enchelycore carychroa, is a moray eel of the family Muraenidae, found in the western Atlantic from Bermuda, southern Florida, the Bahamas, and the western Gulf of Mexico to Brazil, at depths between 1 and 20 m.  Their length is up to 34 cm, or just over 1 ft, making them the smallest members of their genus and among the smaller morays.

The Caribbean chestnut moray inhabits coral and rocky reefs.

References

carychroa
Fish described in 1976
Taxa named by James Erwin Böhlke